Eucalyptopsis papuana is a species of plant in the family Myrtaceae. It is found in Maluku and New Guinea. It is threatened by habitat loss.

References

Myrtaceae
Trees of the Maluku Islands
Trees of New Guinea
Near threatened plants
Taxonomy articles created by Polbot
Plants described in 1951